Faisal Al-Mahmeed (born November 3, 1983) is a Kuwaiti former swimmer, who specialized in backstroke events. Al-Mahmeed competed only in the men's 100 m backstroke at the 2000 Summer Olympics in Sydney. He achieved a FINA B-cut of 58.65 from the Asian Championships in Busan, South Korea. Swimming in heat one, he pulled away from Micronesia's Welbert Samuel to pick up a sixth seed in a time of 1:05.17, a 6.5-second deficit outside his entry standard. Al-Mahmeed failed to advance into the semifinals, as he placed fiftieth overall in the prelims.

References

External links
 

1983 births
Living people
Kuwaiti male swimmers
Olympic swimmers of Kuwait
Swimmers at the 2000 Summer Olympics
Male backstroke swimmers
Sportspeople from Kuwait City